A Kildare County Council election was held in  County Kildare in Ireland on 24 May 2019 as part of that year's local elections. All 40 councillors were elected for a five-year term of office from 8 local electoral areas (LEAs) by single transferable vote.

Following a recommendation of the 2018 Boundary Committee, the boundaries of the LEAs were altered from those used in the 2014 elections. Its terms of reference required no change in the total number of councillors but set a lower maximum LEA size of seven councillors, exceeded by three of the five 2014 LEAs. Other changes were necessitated by population shifts revealed by the 2016 census.

Fianna Fáil remained the largest party with 12 seats although they saw a slight reduction in vote share. Fine Gael increased their vote share by over 2% and also gained an extra 2 seats to have a total of 11. Labour retained their 5 seats on the council. The Social Democrats benefitted from the presence of Catherine Murphy in the County and saw 4 gains with the party winning seats in Clane, Leixlip, Naas and Newbridge. The Green Party returned to the council with 3 seats; its 3 gains coming from Celbridge, Maynooth and Naas.

Sinn Féin lost 4 seats overall as its vote share fell by 67% and the party only came home with 1 seat. Partly due to retirements Independents saw a net loss of 5 seats.

Results by party

Results by local electoral area

Athy

Celbridge

Clane

Kildare

Leixlip

Maynooth

Naas

Newbridge

Results by gender

Changes Since 2019 Local Elections
†Kildare Sinn Féin Cllr Patricia Ryan was elected as a Teachta Dála (TD) for Kildare South at the 2020 general election. Noel Connolly was co-opted to fill the vacancy on 25 February 2020.
††Athy Labour Cllr Mark Wall was elected to the Seanad in April 2020. Mark Leigh was co-opted to fill the vacancy on 26 May 2020.
†††Naas Green Party Cllr Vincent P. Martin was nominated by the Taoiseach to the Seanad in August 2020. Colm Kenny was co-opted to fill the vacancy in September

Footnotes

Sources

References

2019 Irish local elections
2019